The Warehouse was a nightclub established in Chicago, Illinois in 1977 under the direction of Robert Williams. It is best known as one of the birthplaces of house music, specifically Chicago house, and the genre's center in the United States under its first musical director, DJ Frankie Knuckles.

Description
A broad range of dance music was played at the Warehouse; however, first and foremost were R'n'B and Disco. Knuckles experimented with different possibilities of developing an original expression, mixing disco music with European electronic music. DJ History reports: "The style of music now known as house was so named after a shortened version of his [Knuckles'] club."

Located at 206 South Jefferson Street in Chicago, the club was made out of a three-storey former factory. The Warehouse drew in around five hundred patrons from midnight Saturday to midday Sunday. The Warehouse was patronized primarily by gay black and Latino men, who came to dance to disco music played by the club's resident DJ, Frankie Knuckles. Admission was five dollars and the club offered free juice and water to dancers. In the middle floor is where DJ Knuckles began to experiment with editing disco breaks on a reel-to-tape recorder. This mixing would soon become the beginnings of the house music genre.

The Warehouse became a hub for the people of Chicago, specifically black gay men. It was compared to a religious and spiritual experience. At the time, many black gay men felt excluded from the religious communities that they had been raised in. This contributed to the culture created at the Warehouse. It was a place where people could be open and "this sexual openness enabled the club to be unusually free of aggression”.

Chicago house was a specifically black gay genre in many ways for many years and the Warehouse was a specific space that cultivated that scene in a safe way. Black music was at the heart of the disco era and it is impossible to separate the roots of disco from the disenfranchised queer people of color that flocked to it. House is connected to disco in that "it mutated the form, intensifying the very aspects of the music that most offended white rockers and black funkateers: the machinic repetition, the synthetic and electronic textures, the rootlessness, the ‘depraved’ hypersexuality and ‘decadent’ druggy hedonism."

The Warehouse was a place that allowed house music to flourish as a continuation of disco under Frankie Knuckles. It continued the tradition of making music for the club, for people to truly feel and to create a holy dance atmosphere and experience over just trying to make something that could get hits on the radio or top 40 charts. "The stomping four-to-the-floor kick-drum would become the defining mark of house music." Knuckles also used to alter songs by adding synthetic handclaps, special hi-hat patterns and bass loops. This way, he pushed the boundaries of how a song is supposed to sound and how a song can be manipulated to fit a club setting.

Changes
After the Warehouse doubled its admission fee in late 1982, it grew more commercial. Knuckles decided to leave and start his own club the Power Plant, and later the Powerhouse, to which his devoted followers followed. In response, the Warehouse's owners renamed it the Muzic Box and hired a new DJ named Ron Hardy, who became quite influential for the development of house music himself.

Frankie Knuckles tributes
In 2004, the city of Chicago – which "became notorious in the dance community around the world for passing the so-called 'anti-rave ordinance' in 2000 that made property owners, promoters and deejays subject to $10,000 fines for being involved in an unlicensed dance party" – named a stretch of street in downtown Chicago after Knuckles, where the old Warehouse once stood, on Jefferson Street between Jackson Boulevard and Madison Street in Chicago's West Loop. On August 25, 2004, the city renamed the block "Frankie Knuckles Way" and declared August 25 to be Frankie Knuckles Day. Future United States President Barack Obama was among the advocates for the change as an Illinois state senator.

See also

Chicago house
List of electronic dance music venues
Homophobia in the African American community

References

External links
The Warehouse/Music Box, Chicago – Clubbers Guide to Life from Ministry of Sound. Retrieved on September 6, 2007.

41.878956,-87.640536 google maps

1977 disestablishments in Illinois
African-American history in Chicago
Electronic dance music venues
Former music venues in the United States
Hispanic and Latino American culture in Chicago
LGBT African-American culture
LGBT culture in Chicago
LGBT Hispanic and Latino American culture
Music venues completed in 1977
Nightclubs in Chicago